Unai Medina Pérez (born 16 February 1990) is a Spanish professional footballer who plays for Racing de Santander as a right back.

Club career
Born in Bilbao, Biscay, Medina grew in local Athletic Bilbao's youth ranks, but could only appear as a senior for its farm and B teams. In 2012, he left the club and joined Basque Country neighbours Barakaldo CF, being first choice in his first and only season.

In July 2013, Medina signed for Deportivo Alavés, recently promoted to the second division. He made his professional debut on 16 August, in a 0–1 away defeat against Girona FC.

Medina moved to fellow league side CD Numancia on 17 June 2015 after signing a three-year deal. He continued competing in the second tier the following years, with Sporting de Gijón and UD Logroñés.

On 26 July 2021, after Logroñés' relegation, Medina moved to third division side Racing de Santander on a two-year contract, and helped in their promotion to the second tier as a starter.

References

External links

1990 births
Living people
Spanish footballers
Footballers from Bilbao
Association football defenders
Segunda División players
Primera Federación players
Segunda División B players
Tercera División players
CD Laudio players
CD Basconia footballers
Bilbao Athletic footballers
Barakaldo CF footballers
Deportivo Alavés players
CD Numancia players
UD Logroñés players
Athletic Bilbao footballers
Racing de Santander players